Paul S. "Mikey" Glod (April 10, 1919 – April 24, 2004) was an American football player and coach. He served as the head football coach at Marietta College in Marietta, Ohio from 1947 to 1949, Chadron State College in Chadron, Nebraska in 1956 and at Earlham College in Richmond, Indiana in 1960, compiling a career college football coaching record of 18–20–1. Glod played college football Mariett, and in 1947, he was named the head football coach at his alma mater, making him the youngest head coach in school history. He completed his tenure at Marietta with a record of 8–15.  Good was hired as an assistant football coach at Frostburg State University in Frostburg, Maryland in 1959. 

Glod died on April 24, 2004, at his home in North Huntingdon, Pennsylvania.

Head coaching record

Football

References

External links
 

1919 births
2004 deaths
American football halfbacks
West Virginia Wesleyan Bobcats football players
Marietta Pioneers football players
Marietta Pioneers football coaches
Chadron State Eagles football coaches
Earlham Quakers football coaches
Frostburg State Bobcats football coaches
People from Fayette County, Pennsylvania
Coaches of American football from Pennsylvania
Players of American football from Pennsylvania